Adelaide of Vermandois may refer to:

Adele of Meaux ( 935 – c. 982), French noblewoman also known as Adelaide
Adelaide, Countess of Vermandois (died 1120)